An  ("registered association" or "incorporated association"), abbreviated , is a legal status for a registered voluntary association in Germany. The legal status must be mentioned in the name as well. Like certain other corporate bodies, an  can apply for the status of a charitable organization.

Legal basis

The Civil Code of Germany regulates registered non-profit, and for-profit associations regarded as juridical persons in sections 21–79 and any other associations by contract in sections 705–740. These are regulated in separate statutes as special economic associations but bear the same basic features.

All natural and juridical persons in Germany, including entities such as municipalities, counties, and other entities under public law, can form associations and be members of an association. This means that associations are not limited to private clubs formed by natural persons but have a much broader scope. They can be very locally limited club-like institutions but also nationwide units representing important economic or social groups. It is even possible that registered associations themselves form a new association whose membership is composed entirely of associations (often called ).

The statutory minimum number of members for forming a registered association is seven. The minimum number of members before a registered association needs to be dissolved is three. The largest associations can have over one million members, there is no legal limit concerning membership numbers.

Registration

Differences to other jurisdictions
In other German-speaking countries such a distinction does not exist. But there may be legal requirements which oblige an association to register itself; for example, in Switzerland there is no association registry, but an association must be listed in the commercial register if its yearly turnover is high enough to legally require an audit.

References

Further reading 

Law of Austria
German business law
Legal entities
Law of Switzerland
Non-profit organisations based in Germany

de:Verein#Eingetragener Verein